61 Aquarii, abbreviated 61 Aqr, is an orange-hued star in the zodiac constellation of Aquarius. 61 Aquarii is its Flamsteed designation. It has an apparent visual magnitude of 6.39, which indicates it is a dim star that requires good seeing conditions to view. It is moving closer to the Earth with a heliocentric radial velocity of −8 km/s.

This is an evolved K-type giant star with a stellar classification of K4 III, which indicates it has consumed the hydrogen at its core and expanded. It has an estimated 0.57 times the mass of the Sun but with over 11 times the Sun's radius. The star is radiating 127 times the Sun's luminosity from its enlarged photosphere at an effective temperature of 4,430 K.

References

K-type giants
Aquarius (constellation)
Durchmusterung objects
Aquarii, 061
214028
111539